Essence is an album by Shelly Manne released on the Galaxy label in 1977.

Track listing 
 "What Am I Here For?" (Duke Ellington) – 7:20
 "Yesterdays" (Jerome Kern, Otto Harbach) – 3:04
 "Take the Coltrane" (Ellington) – 8:44
 "Ain’t Misbehavin'" (Fats Waller, Andy Razaf) – 5:42
 "Essence" (Shelly Manne, Lew Tabackin, Mike Wofford, Chuck Domanico) – 4:57
 "Soon" (George Gershwin, Ira Gershwin) – 4:33
 "Body and Soul" (Johnny Green, Edward Heyman, Robert Sour, Frank Eyton) – 6:01

Personnel 
 Shelly Manne – drums
 Lew Tabackin – tenor saxophone, flute
 Mike Wofford – piano
 Chuck Domanico – bass

References 

1977 albums
Shelly Manne albums
Galaxy Records albums